The Minerals Council South Africa is a South African mining-industry employer organisation. Its members include famous South African mining houses such as Anglo American, De Beers, Gold Fields and Harmony. In its current form, it was founded in 1968 as the Chamber of Mines, a South African wide organization. Prior to that year, it has its early origins as the Transvaal Chamber of Mines in 1887, then evolved over many years reforming as the Witwatersrand Chamber of Mines in 1889, the Chamber of Mines of the South African Republic from 1897, Transvaal Chamber of Mines from 1902 and lastly from 1953 until 1967 as the Transvaal and Orange Free State Chamber of Mines. On 23 May 2018, the South African Chamber of Mines rebranded themselves as the Minerals Council South Africa.

Early history 
On 21 October 1887, the Transvaal Chamber of Mines met for the first time at Central Hotel in Johannesburg. Forty seven people attended the first meeting and its first President was Henry Struben. The organizations main aim was to disseminate information, the reading of technical and scientific papers, publishing monthly gold returns, financial issues and other mining issues but after a few meetings the group petered out. More than a year later in 1889, the Chamber was reconstituted as the Witwatersrand Chamber of Mines. Its new president was Hermann Eckstein and the honorary President was Paul Kruger.

The early work of the Chamber was a uniform standard of treatment for black mine workers on the members mines, advocated for changes to the Gold Law legislation and for a railway system with the South African Republic government.  By 1892, Eckstein took up post in London and Lionel Phillips took over as President of the Chamber on 1 January 1893.

Previous presidents 

 1889-92 Hermann Eckstein
 1892-96 Lionel Phillips
 1896-98 James Hay
 1898-1902 Georges Rouliot
 1902-03 Sir Percy Fitzpatrick
 1903-04 Sir George Farrar
 1904-05 H.F Strange
 1905-06 F.D.P Chaplin
 1906-07 J.N de Jongh
 1907-08 Louis Julius Reyersbach
 1908-09 Lionel Phillips
 1909-10 J.W.S Langerman
 1910-11 John Gardiner Hamilton

References 

Employers' organisations in South Africa
Mining in South Africa
Organisations based in Johannesburg